The Dubois-Phelps House is a farmhouse located off Wallkill Road outside of the village of Walden in the Town of Montgomery, New York, United States. It is in the center of Riverside Farm, close to the Wallkill River.

The original farmhouse was built sometime in the 18th century. In 1851, Nathaniel DuBois bought it and renovated it extensively in the Greek Revival style, creating the building as it exists today. The Phelps family, its current occupant, bought the property from his descendants in 1922.

It was added to the National Register of Historic Places in 1997.

References

Houses on the National Register of Historic Places in New York (state)
Houses in Orange County, New York
National Register of Historic Places in Orange County, New York
Greek Revival houses in New York (state)
Houses completed in 1851
Wallkill River
1851 establishments in New York (state)